Dioscorea praehensilis is a species of yam in the genus Dioscorea native to Africa. It is the wild progenitor of the West African domesticated crops Dioscorea rotundata and Dioscorea cayennensis. It is a liana with an edible tuber root found in African rainforests and seasonal tropical forests. The roots reach their maximum starch reserves during the dry season. The species renews its stems every year at the start of the rainy season.

References

Flora of West Tropical Africa
Flora of West-Central Tropical Africa
Flora of East Tropical Africa
Flora of South Tropical Africa
praehensilis